Šavna Peč is a settlement in the Municipality of Hrastnik in central Slovenia. The area is part of the traditional region of Styria. It is now included with the rest of the municipality in the Central Sava Statistical Region.

Geography
It is sheltered by a similar (partly rocky) slope above it.

Notable people
Šavna Peč is the birthplace of Antón Sovrè, a Slovenian classical philologist, high school educator, and translator. There is a small museum in an old granary with a standing ethnology exhibition and some of Sovrè's works. The museum and the settlement are registered as a cultural heritage site. 

The Sovrè Trail leads from the valley below to the village, and a traditional commemorative hike has been held on it on every first Saturday in October since 2004.

References

External links
Šavna Peč on Geopedia

Populated places in the Municipality of Hrastnik